Marinella & Voskopoulos (Greek: Μαρινέλλα & Βοσκόπουλος) is the name of a studio album by popular Greek singers Marinella and Tolis Voskopoulos. It was released in 1974 by Minos EMI in Greece. This album was issued in mono and stereo. The stereo version of this album was released on CD in 1994 by EMI.

Track listing 

Side One.
 "Den echi dromo na diavis" (Δεν έχει δρόμο να διαβείς; There's not street to cross) – (Tolis Voskopoulos - Mimis Theiopoulos)
 "Ti ichame - ti chasame" (Τι είχαμε - τι χάσαμε; What we had - what we missed) – (Tolis Voskopoulos - Tasos Economou)
 "Parapono" (Παράπονο; Complaint) – (Tolis Voskopoulos - Mimis Theiopoulos)
 "Pou pigenis Katinaki" (Πού πηγαίνεις Κατινάκι; Katinaki, where are you going?) – (Tolis Voskopoulos - Mimis Theiopoulos
 "Vre ti ginete ston kosmo" (Βρε τι γίνεται στον κόσμο; Hey, what happens in the world) – (Tolis Voskopoulos - Mimis Theiopoulos)
 "Oli i zoi enas kaimos" (Όλη η ζωή ένας καημός; All life is a sorrow) – (Tolis Voskopoulos - Mimis Theiopoulos)
Side Two.
 "Na 'se kala" (Να 'σαι καλά; Thanks a lot) – (Giannis Spanos - Pythagoras)
 "Se sygchoro" (Σε συγχωρώ; I forgive you) – (Giannis Spanos - Pythagoras)
 "Echi o Theos" (Έχει ο Θεός; God has in store) – (Giannis Spanos - Pythagoras)
 "Pos" (Πώς; How?) – (Giannis Spanos - Pythagoras)
 "Pos den sou paei" (Πως δεν σου πάει; That doesn't suit you) – (Giannis Spanos - Pythagoras)
 "Irthe enas filos" (Ήρθε ένας φίλος; A friend came) – (Giannis Spanos - Pythagoras)

Personnel 
 Marinella - vocals, background vocals
 Tolis Voskopoulos - vocals, background vocals, arranger and conductor on tracks 1 - 6
 Giannis Spanos - arranger and conductor on tracks 7 - 12
 Achilleas Theofilou - producer 
 Yiannis Smyrneos - recording engineer
 Babis Benakis - photographer

References

1974 albums
Marinella albums
Tolis Voskopoulos albums
Greek-language albums
Minos EMI albums